The 1969 UCI Road World Championships took place on 10 August 1969 in Zolder, Belgium (for professionals), and from 22-24 August 1969 in Brno, Czechoslovakia (for amateurs).

Results

Medal table

External links 

 Men's results
 Women's results
  Results at sportpro.it

 
UCI Road World Championships by year
UCI Road World Championships 1969
UCI Road World Championships
Uci Road World Championships, 1969
Circuit Zolder
UCI Road World Championships